The Estates Theatre or Stavovské divadlo is a historic theater in Prague, Czech Republic.

History 
The Estates Theatre was built during the late 18th century in response to Enlightenment thought regarding general access to the theatre, and theatres themselves demonstrating the cultural standards of a nation. The Estates Theatre was designed by Anton Haffenecker and built in a little less than two years for the aristocrat Franz Anton von Nostitz-Rieneck. 

Prague's first standing public theatre, the Sporck Theatre, operated from 1724 to 1735.  The owner of this theatre, Count Franz Anton von Sporck, permitted the free use of it to subsidize the commercial venture of the Venetian impresario Antonio Denzio. The next commercial theatre, the "Kotzentheater" or Divadlo v Kotcích, operated sporadically from 1739–1783 under a series of Italian impresarios. The final closure of the "Kotzentheater" coincided with the opening of Count Nostitz’s "Nostitzsches Nationaltheater."  The theatre opened in 1783 with a performance of the tragedy Emilia Galotti by the German playwright Gotthold Ephraim Lessing. The building itself was constructed in a Neoclassical style and remains one of the few European theatres to be preserved in its almost original state to the present day. Its motto, Patriae et Musis "To the Native Land and the Muses"), which is inscribed above the portal, should also be noted as reflecting the original intentions of its creator.

The Estates Theatre has undergone several changes in its history. It first acquired the name Royal Theatre of the Estates in 1798 when it was purchased by the Bohemian Estates. With the opening of the Provisional Theatre in 1862, the Czech ensemble left and the Theatre of the Estates was dedicated to a solely German ensemble and was renamed to Deutsches Landestheater (Provincial German Theatre). It was taken from the German ensemble in 1920. During the period between 1920 and 1948 the theatre regained the name Theatre of the Estates and became affiliated with the National Theatre. In 1948 the theatre was renamed the Tyl Theatre (after dramatist J.K. Tyl) and would be known as such until 1990 when, at the end of an eight-year reconstruction project, it became known again as the Estates Theatre.

Productions and artists 

While the theatre was initially built with the intention of producing German dramas and Italian operas, works in other languages were also staged. Czech productions were first staged in 1785 in order to reach a broader Czech audience but by 1812 they became a regular feature of Sunday and holiday matinées. The somewhat political nature of these performances later led to idea of founding a National Theatre after 1848 with the defeat of the revolution and the departure of J.K. Tyl. Many of the founding Czech dramatists were involved in the Estates Theatre, such as the brothers Thám (Karel and Václav), J.K. Tyl, Ján Kollár, and so on. The first Czech modern opera, František Škroup’s The Tinker, was staged here in 1826 and in 1834 the premiere of the song “Where is my Home?” (Kde domov můj) was performed by bass Karel Strakatý (words by Tyl, music by Škroup), which would later become the Czech national anthem.

The Estates Theatre was not limited to native participants; many famous European artists were also active. Individuals such as Carl Maria von Weber, Anton Rubinstein, Karl Goldmark, and Gustav Mahler conducted at the Estates Theatre. Other famous names include the actors A.W. Iffland, F. Raimund, J.N. Nestroy, along with opera singer Angelica Catalani and violin virtuoso Niccolò Paganini.

One of the Estates Theatre’s many claims to glory is its strong link with Wolfgang Amadeus Mozart, who conducted the world premiere of his opera Don Giovanni here in October 1787. Also, in 1791, Mozart’s La Clemenza di Tito was staged in public here for the first time in celebration of the coronation of Emperor Leopold II. It is the only theatre left standing where Mozart performed.

Anton Jaich, the set designer, worked here from 1846 to 1861.

Recent history 
The Estates Theatre currently offers performances of dramas, ballets and operas with the focus of the opera company on the work of Wolfgang Amadeus Mozart. Most of the opera scenes of Miloš Forman's film Amadeus were shot at the Estates Theatre. The theatre was also featured in the Beethoven biopic, Immortal Beloved, starring Gary Oldman.

Anna Chromy's statue Il Commendatore, inspired by the character from Don Giovanni, was installed in front of the theatre in 2000.

References
Notes

External links

 
 TACE – entry in TACE database

Opera houses in the Czech Republic
Nostitz family
Theatres in Prague
Music venues in Prague
National Cultural Monuments of the Czech Republic
Theatres completed in 1783
Music venues completed in 1783
1783 establishments in the Holy Roman Empire